Pangaea or Pangea was a supercontinent that existed during the late Paleozoic and early Mesozoic eras. It assembled from the earlier continental units of Gondwana, Euramerica and Siberia during the Carboniferous approximately 335 million years ago, and began to break apart about 200 million years ago, at the end of the Triassic and beginning of the Jurassic. In contrast to the present Earth and its distribution of continental mass, Pangaea was centred on the equator and surrounded by the superocean Panthalassa and the Paleo-Tethys and subsequent Tethys Oceans. Pangaea is the most recent supercontinent to have existed and the first to be reconstructed by geologists.

Origin of the concept 

The name "Pangaea" is derived from Ancient Greek pan ("all, entire, whole") and Gaia or Gaea ("Mother Earth, land"). The concept that the continents once formed a contiguous land mass was hypothesised, with corroborating evidence, by Alfred Wegener, the originator of the scientific theory of continental drift, in his 1912 publication The Origin of Continents (Die Entstehung der Kontinente). He expanded upon his hypothesis in his 1915 book The Origin of Continents and Oceans (Die Entstehung der Kontinente und Ozeane), in which he postulated that, before breaking up and drifting to their present locations, all the continents had formed a single supercontinent that he called the "Urkontinent".

The name "Pangaea" occurs in the 1920 edition of Die Entstehung der Kontinente und Ozeane, but only once, when Wegener refers to the ancient supercontinent as "the Pangaea of the Carboniferous". Wegener used the Germanized form "Pangäa," but the name entered German and English scientific literature (in 1922 and 1926, respectively) in the Latinized form "Pangaea" (of the Greek "Pangaia"), especially due to a symposium of the American Association of Petroleum Geologists in November 1926.

Wegener originally proposed that the breakup of Pangaea was due to centripetal forces from the Earth's rotation acting on the high continents. However, this mechanism was easily shown to be physically implausible, which delayed acceptance of the Pangaea hypothesis. Arthur Holmes proposed the more plausible mechanism of mantle convection, which, together with evidence provided by the mapping of the ocean floor following the Second World War, led to the development and acceptance of the theory of plate tectonics. This theory provides the now widely-accepted explanation for the existence and breakup of Pangaea.

Evidence of existence

The geography of the continents bordering the Atlantic Ocean was the first evidence suggesting the existence of Pangaea. The seemingly close fit of the coastlines of North and South America with Europe and Africa was remarked on almost as soon as these coasts were charted. The first to suggest that these continents were once joined and later separated may have been Abraham Ortelius in 1596.

Additional evidence for Pangaea is found in the geology of adjacent continents, including matching geological trends between the eastern coast of South America and the western coast of Africa. The polar ice cap of the Carboniferous Period covered the southern end of Pangaea. Glacial deposits, specifically till, of the same age and structure are found on many separate continents that would have been together in the continent of Pangaea. The continuity of mountain chains provides further evidence, such as the Appalachian Mountains chain extending from the southeastern United States to the Caledonides of Ireland, Britain, Greenland, and Scandinavia. 

Fossil evidence for Pangaea includes the presence of similar and identical species on continents that are now great distances apart. For example, fossils of the therapsid Lystrosaurus have been found in South Africa, India and Antarctica, alongside members of the Glossopteris flora, whose distribution would have ranged from the polar circle to the equator if the continents had been in their present position; similarly, the freshwater reptile Mesosaurus has been found in only localized regions of the coasts of Brazil and West Africa.

Geologists can also determine the movement of continental plates by examining the orientation of magnetic minerals in rocks. When rocks are formed, they take on the magnetic orientation of the Earth, showing which direction the poles lie relative to the rock; this determines latitudes and orientations (though not longitudes). Magnetic differences between samples of sedimentary and intrusive igneous rock whose age varies by millions of years is due to a combination of magnetic polar wander (with a cycle of a few thousand years) and the drifting of continents over millions of years. One can subtract the polar wander component, which is identical for all contemporaneous samples,  leaving the portion that shows continental drift and can be used to help reconstruct earlier continental latitudes and orientations.

Formation

Pangaea is only the most recent supercontinent reconstructed from the geologic record. The formation of supercontinents and their breakup appears to have been cyclical through Earth's history. There may have been several others before Pangaea. 

Paleomagnetic measurements help geologists determine the latitude and orientation of ancient continental blocks, and newer techniques may help determine longitudes. Paleontology helps determine ancient climates, confirming latitude estimates from paleomagnetic measurements, and the distribution of ancient forms of life provides clues on which continental blocks were close to each other at particular geological moments. However, reconstructions of continents prior to Pangaea, including the ones in this section, remain partially speculative, and different reconstructions will differ in some details.

Previous supercontinents
The fourth-last supercontinent, called Columbia or Nuna, appears to have assembled in the period 2.0–1.8 billion years ago (Ga). Columbia/Nuna broke up and the next supercontinent, Rodinia, formed from the accretion and assembly of its fragments. Rodinia lasted from about 1.3 billion years ago until about 750 million years ago, but its exact configuration and geodynamic history are not nearly as well understood as those of the later supercontinents, Pannotia and Pangaea.

According to one reconstruction, when Rodinia broke up, it split into three pieces: the supercontinent of Proto-Laurasia, the supercontinent of Proto-Gondwana, and the smaller Congo craton. Proto-Laurasia and Proto-Gondwana were separated by the Proto-Tethys Ocean. Next Proto-Laurasia itself split apart to form the continents of Laurentia, Siberia, and Baltica. Baltica moved to the east of Laurentia, and Siberia moved northeast of Laurentia. The splitting also created two new oceans, the Iapetus Ocean and Paleoasian Ocean. Most of the above masses coalesced again to form the relatively short-lived supercontinent of Pannotia. This supercontinent included large amounts of land near the poles and, near the equator, only a relatively small strip connecting the polar masses. Pannotia lasted until 540 Ma, near the beginning of the Cambrian period and then broke up, giving rise to the continents of Laurentia, Baltica, and the southern supercontinent of Gondwana.

Formation of Euramerica (Laurussia)
In the Cambrian period, the continent of Laurentia, which would later become North America, sat on the equator, with three bordering oceans: the Panthalassic Ocean to the north and west, the Iapetus Ocean to the south, and the Khanty Ocean to the east. In the Earliest Ordovician, around 480 Ma, the microcontinent of Avalonia – a landmass incorporating fragments of what would become eastern Newfoundland, the southern British Isles, and parts of Belgium, northern France, Nova Scotia, New England, South Iberia, and northwest Africa – broke free from Gondwana and began its journey to Laurentia. Baltica, Laurentia, and Avalonia all came together by the end of the Ordovician to form a landmass called Euramerica or Laurussia, closing the Iapetus Ocean. The collision also resulted in the formation of the northern Appalachians. Siberia sat near Euramerica, with the Khanty Ocean between the two continents. While all this was happening, Gondwana drifted slowly towards the South Pole. This was the first step of the formation of Pangaea.

Collision of Gondwana with Euramerica
The second step in the formation of Pangaea was the collision of Gondwana with Euramerica. By the middle of the Silurian, 430 Ma, Baltica had already collided with Laurentia, forming Euramerica, an event called the Caledonian orogeny. Avalonia had not yet collided with Laurentia, but as Avalonia inched towards Laurentia, the seaway between them, a remnant of the Iapetus Ocean, was slowly shrinking. Meanwhile, southern Europe broke off from Gondwana and began to move towards Euramerica across the Rheic Ocean. It collided with southern Baltica in the Devonian.

By the late Silurian, Annamia and South China split from Gondwana and started to head northward, shrinking the Proto-Tethys Ocean in their path and opening the new Paleo-Tethys Ocean to their south. In the Devonian Period, Gondwana itself headed towards Euramerica, causing the Rheic Ocean to shrink. In the Early Carboniferous, northwest Africa had touched the southeastern coast of Euramerica, creating the southern portion of the Appalachian Mountains, the Meseta Mountains, and the Mauritanide Mountains, an event called the Variscan orogeny. South America moved northward to southern Euramerica, while the eastern portion of Gondwana (India, Antarctica, and Australia) headed toward the South Pole from the equator. North and South China were on independent continents. The Kazakhstania microcontinent had collided with Siberia. (Siberia had been a separate continent for millions of years since the deformation of the supercontinent Pannotia in the Middle Carboniferous.)

The Variscan orogeny raised the Central Pangaean Mountains, which were comparable to the modern Himalayas in scale. With Pangaea now stretching from the South Pole across the equator and well into the Northern Hemisphere, an intense megamonsoon climate was established, except for a perpetually wet zone immediately around the central mountains.

Formation of Laurasia
Western Kazakhstania collided with Baltica in the Late Carboniferous, closing the Ural Ocean between them and the western Proto-Tethys in them (Uralian orogeny), causing the formation of not only the Ural Mountains, but also the supercontinent of Laurasia. This was the last step of the formation of Pangaea. Meanwhile, South America had collided with southern Laurentia, closing the Rheic Ocean and completing the Variscian orogeny with the formation the southernmost part of the Appalachians and Ouachita Mountains. By this time, Gondwana was positioned near the South Pole, and glaciers were forming in Antarctica, India, Australia, southern Africa, and South America. The North China block collided with Siberia by Jurassic, completely closing the Proto-Tethys Ocean.

By the Early Permian, the Cimmerian plate split from Gondwana and headed towards Laurasia, thus closing the Paleo-Tethys Ocean, but forming a new ocean, the Tethys Ocean, in its southern end. Most of the landmasses were all in one. By the Triassic Period, Pangaea rotated a little, and the Cimmerian plate was still travelling across the shrinking Paleo-Tethys until the Middle Jurassic. By the late Triassic, the Paleo-Tethys had closed from west to east, creating the Cimmerian Orogeny. Pangaea, which looked like a C, with the new Tethys Ocean inside the C, had rifted by the Middle Jurassic, and its deformation is explained below.

Life 

Pangaea existed as a supercontinent for 160 million years, from its assembly around 335 million years ago (Early Carboniferous) to its breakup 175 million years ago (Middle Jurassic). During this interval, important developments in the evolution of life took place. The seas of the Early Carboniferous were dominated by rugose corals, brachiopods, bryozoans, sharks, and the first bony fish. Life on land was dominated by lycopsid forests inhabited by insects and other arthropods and the first tetrapods. By the time Pangaea broke up, in the Middle Jurassic, the seas swarmed with molluscs (particularly ammonites), ichthyosaurs, sharks and rays, and the first ray-finned bony fishes, while life on land was dominated by forests of cycads and conifers in which dinosaurs flourished and in which the first true mammals had appeared.

The evolution of life in this time reflected the conditions created by the assembly of Pangaea. The union of most of the continental crust into one landmass reduced the extent of sea coasts. Increased erosion from uplifted continental crust increased the importance of floodplain and delta environments relative to shallow marine environments. Continental assembly and uplift also meant increasingly arid land climates, favoring the evolution of amniote animals and seed plants, whose eggs and seeds were better adapted to dry climates. The early drying trend was most pronounced in western Pangaea, which became a center of the evolution and geographical spread of amniotes.

Coal swamps typically form in perpetually wet regions close to the equator. The assembly of Pangaea disrupted the intertropical convergence zone and created an extreme monsoon climate that reduced the deposition of coal to its lowest level in the last 300 million years. During the Permian, coal deposition was largely restricted to the North and South China microcontinents, which were among the few areas of continental crust that had not joined with Pangaea. The extremes of climate in the interior of Pangaea are reflected in bone growth patterns of pareiasaurs and the growth patterns in gymnosperm forests. 

The lack of oceanic barriers is thought to have favored cosmopolitanism, in which successful species attain wide geographical distribution. Cosmopolitanism was also driven by mass extinctions, including the Permian–Triassic extinction event, the most severe in the fossil record, and also the Triassic–Jurassic extinction event. These events resulted in disaster fauna showing little diversity and high cosmopolitanism, including Lystrosaurus, which opportunistically spread to every corner of Pangaea following the Permian–Triassic extinction event. On the other hand, there is evidence that many Pangaean species were provincial, with a limited geographical range, despite the absence of geographical barriers. This may be due to the strong variations in climate by latitude and season produced by the extreme monsoon climate. For example, cold-adapted pteridosperms (early seed plants) of Gondwana were blocked from spreading throughout Pangaea by the equatorial climate, and northern pteridosperms ended up dominating Gondwana in the Triassic.

Mass extinctions 
The tectonics and geography of Pangaea may have worsened the Permian–Triassic extinction event or other extinctions. For example, the reduced area of continental shelf environments may have left marine species vulnerable to extinction. However, no evidence for a species-area effect has been found in more recent and better characterized portions of the geologic record. Another possibility is that reduced sea-floor spreading associated with the formation of Pangaea, and the resulting cooling and subsidence of oceanic crust, may have reduced the number of islands that could have served as refugia for marine species. Species diversity may have already been reduced prior to mass extinction events due to mingling of species possible when formerly separate continents were merged. However, there is strong evidence that climate barriers continued to separate ecological communities in different parts of Pangaea. The eruptions of the Emeishan Traps may have eliminated South China, one of the few continental areas not merged with Pangaea, as a refugium.

Rifting and break-up

There were three major phases in the break-up of Pangaea.

Opening of the Atlantic
The Atlantic Ocean did not open uniformly; rifting began in the north-central Atlantic. The first breakup of Pangaea is proposed for the late Ladinian (230 Ma) with initial spreading in the opening central Atlantic. Then the rifting proceeded along the eastern margin of North America, the northwest African margin and the High, Saharan and Tunisian Atlas. 

Another phase began in the Early-Middle Jurassic (about 175 Ma), when Pangaea began to rift from the Tethys Ocean in the east to the Pacific Ocean in the west. The rifting that took place between North America and Africa produced multiple failed rifts. One rift resulted in a new ocean, the North Atlantic Ocean.

The South Atlantic did not open until the Cretaceous when Laurasia started to rotate clockwise and moved northward with North America to the north, and Eurasia to the south. The clockwise motion of Laurasia led much later to the closing of the Tethys Ocean and the widening of the "Sinus Borealis", which later became the Arctic Ocean. Meanwhile, on the other side of Africa and along the adjacent margins of east Africa, Antarctica and Madagascar, new rifts were forming that would lead to the formation of the southwestern Indian Ocean that would open up in the Cretaceous.

Break-up of Gondwana
The second major phase in the break-up of Pangaea began in the Early Cretaceous (150–140 Ma), when the landmass of Gondwana separated into multiple continents (Africa, South America, India, Antarctica, and Australia). The subduction at Tethyan Trench probably caused Africa, India and Australia to move northward, causing the opening of a "South Indian Ocean". In the Early Cretaceous, Atlantica, today's South America and Africa, finally separated from eastern Gondwana (Antarctica, India and Australia). Then in the Middle Cretaceous, Gondwana fragmented to open up the South Atlantic Ocean as South America started to move westward away from Africa. The South Atlantic did not develop uniformly; rather, it rifted from south to north.

Also, at the same time, Madagascar and India began to separate from Antarctica and moved northward, opening up the Indian Ocean. Madagascar and India separated from each other 100–90 Ma in the Late Cretaceous. India continued to move northward toward Eurasia at 15 centimeters (6 in) a year (a plate tectonic record), closing the eastern Tethys Ocean, while Madagascar stopped and became locked to the African Plate. New Zealand, New Caledonia and the rest of Zealandia began to separate from Australia, moving eastward toward the Pacific and opening the Coral Sea and Tasman Sea.

Opening of the Norwegian Sea and break-up of Australia and Antarctica
The third major and final phase of the break-up of Pangaea occurred in the early Cenozoic (Paleocene to Oligocene). Laurasia split when North America/Greenland (also called Laurentia) broke free from Eurasia, opening the Norwegian Sea about 60–55 Ma. The Atlantic and Indian Oceans continued to expand, closing the Tethys Ocean.

Meanwhile, Australia split from Antarctica and moved quickly northward, just as India had done more than 40 million years before. Australia is currently on a collision course with eastern Asia. Both Australia and India are currently moving northeast at 5–6 centimeters (2–3 in) a year. Antarctica has been near or at the South Pole since the formation of Pangaea about 280 Ma. India started to collide with Asia beginning about 35 Ma, forming the Himalayan orogeny, and also finally closing the Tethys Seaway; this collision continues today. The African Plate started to change directions, from west to northwest toward Europe, and South America began to move in a northward direction, separating it from Antarctica and allowing complete oceanic circulation around Antarctica for the first time. This motion, together with decreasing atmospheric carbon dioxide concentrations, caused a rapid cooling of Antarctica and allowed glaciers to form. This glaciation eventually coalesced into the kilometers-thick ice sheets seen today. Other major events took place during the Cenozoic, including the opening of the Gulf of California, the uplift of the Alps, and the opening of the Sea of Japan. The break-up of Pangaea continues today in the Red Sea Rift and East African Rift.

Climate change after Pangaea 
The breakup of Pangaea was accompanied by outgassing of large quantities of carbon dioxide from continental rifts. This produced a Mesozoic CO2 High that contributed to the very warm climate of the Early Cretaceous. The opening of the Tethys Ocean also contributed to the warming of the climate. The very active mid-ocean ridges associated with the breakup of Pangaea raised sea levels to the highest in the geological record, flooding much of the continents.

The expansion of the temperate climate zones that accompanied the breakup of Pangaea may have contributed to the diversification of the angiosperms.

See also 
 History of Earth
 Potential future supercontinents: Pangaea Ultima, Novopangaea & Amasia
 Supercontinent cycle
 Wilson Cycle

References

External links 

 USGS Overview
 Map of Triassic Pangaea at Paleomaps
 NHM Gallery

Carboniferous paleogeography
Former supercontinents
Historical continents
Jurassic paleogeography
Permian paleogeography
Plate tectonics
Triassic paleogeography